Dancer in the Dark is a 2000 musical drama film written and directed by Lars von Trier. It stars Icelandic musician Björk as a factory worker who suffers from a degenerative eye condition and is saving for an operation to prevent her young son from suffering the same fate. Catherine Deneuve, David Morse, Cara Seymour, Peter Stormare, Siobhan Fallon Hogan and Joel Grey also star. The soundtrack for the film, Selmasongs, was written mainly by Björk, but a number of songs featured contributions from Mark Bell and some of the lyrics were written by von Trier and Sjón.

Dancer in the Dark is the third and final installment in von Trier's second trilogy "Golden Heart", following Breaking the Waves (1996) and The Idiots (1998). It was an international co-production among companies based in thirteen European and North American countries and regions. Like the first installment, it was shot with a handheld camera inspired by Dogme 95, although it was not permitted as an actual due to use of music and violence.

Dancer in the Dark premiered at the 2000 Cannes Film Festival and got awarded the Palme d'Or, along with the Best Actress award for Björk. The film received generally positive reviews and Björk's performance was highly acclaimed, but criticism was directed at its plot. The song "I've Seen It All" performed and co-wrote by Björk, with Sjón and von Trier, were nominated for an Academy Award for Best Original Song but lost to "Things Have Changed" by Bob Dylan from Wonder Boys.

Plot
In Washington state in 1964, Selma Ježková, a Czech immigrant, has moved to the United States with her 12-year-old son, Gene Ježek. They live a life of poverty as Selma works at a factory with her good friend Kathy, whom she nicknames Cvalda. She rents a trailer home on the property of local police officer Bill Houston and his wife, Linda. She is romantically pursued by the shy but persistent Jeff, who also works at the factory.

Selma is gradually losing her vision due to a degenerative eye condition, but is saving money to pay for an operation that will prevent Gene from sharing her fate. She also takes part in rehearsals for a production of The Sound of Music and accompanies Kathy to the local cinema, where together they watch Hollywood musicals, as Kathy describes them to her.

In her day-to-day life, Selma slips into daydreams, imagining herself in a musical ("Cvalda"). Jeff and Kathy begin to realize that Selma's vision is worse than they thought, and that she has been memorizing eye charts in order to pass vision tests and keep her job ("I've Seen it All"). Bill reveals to Selma that Linda's excessive spending has put the couple's house in danger of foreclosure by their bank. He has contemplated suicide, but cannot bring himself to carry out the act. Selma promises to keep his secret and confides in him about her advancing vision loss. Bill pretends to leave the trailer but stays, knowing that Selma cannot see him, and watches her hide her money in a tin.

The next day, Selma accidentally breaks a machine at the factory and is fired from her job. She returns home to add her last wages to the tin, but discovers it to be empty. Realizing that Bill has robbed her, she goes to his house to confront him. Linda accuses Selma of trying to seduce her husband, explaining that Bill told her Selma wanted him for his money. Not wanting to reveal her knowledge of the impending foreclosure, Selma ignores Linda and confronts Bill about the theft. They fight over the money, with Bill drawing a gun only to be accidentally shot by Selma.

Bill yells for Linda to call the police, saying that Selma has tried to rob him, then begs Selma to kill him, telling her it is the only way she will ever reclaim her stolen money. Selma shoots Bill several times, but only wounds him further due to her poor vision, and finally beats him to death with a safe deposit box once the gun runs out of ammunition. She slips into a trance and imagines that Bill's corpse stands up and slow dances with her ("Scatterheart"). Taking her money back, she flees the house and pays for Gene's operation in advance.

Not knowing about the murder, Jeff takes Selma to rehearsal, where her director calls the police to have her arrested ("In the Musicals"). In court, she is accused of being a Communist sympathizer and of pretending to be blind to exploit the American healthcare system. Although she tells as much truth about the situation as she can, she refuses to reveal Bill's secret, saying that she had promised not to. When her claim of sending all her money to her father in Czechoslovakia is proven false, she is convicted of murder and sentenced to death. Kathy and Jeff eventually figure out what happened and get back Selma's money, using it instead to pay for a trial lawyer who can free her. Selma refuses the lawyer, opting to face execution by hanging rather than let her son go blind, but she is deeply distraught as she awaits her death ("107 Steps"). As Selma begins crying, Kathy runs in to tell her that the operation was successful, and that Gene will see. Relieved, Selma sings a final song on the gallows with no musical accompaniment. The trap door opens, and she is hanged before she can finish the last verse, whose lines are displayed as the proceedings conclude ("New World").

Cast

Production

The film's title suggests the Fred Astaire/Cyd Charisse duet "Dancing in the Dark" from the 1953 film The Band Wagon, which ties in with the film's musical theatre theme.

Actress Björk, who is known primarily as a contemporary musician, had rarely acted before, and described the process of making this film as so emotionally taxing that she would not act in any film ever again (although she appeared in Matthew Barney's film installation Drawing Restraint 9 in 2005, and in Robert Eggers' The Northman). Trier and others have described her performance as feeling rather than acting. Björk has said that it is a misunderstanding that she was put off acting by this film; rather, she never wanted to act but made an exception for Lars von Trier.

The musical sequences were filmed simultaneously with over 100 digital cameras so that multiple angles of the performance could be captured and cut together later, thus shortening the filming schedule.

Björk lies down on a stack of birch logs during the "Scatterheart" sequence. In Icelandic and Swedish, "björk" means "birch".

A Danish MY class locomotive (owned by Swedish train operator TÅGAB) was painted in the American Great Northern scheme for the film, and not repainted afterward. A T43 class locomotive was repainted too, though never used in the film.

Style
Much of the film has a similar look to von Trier's earlier Dogme 95-influenced films: it is filmed on low-end, hand-held digital cameras to create a documentary-style appearance. It is not a true Dogme 95 film, however, because the Dogme rules stipulate that violence, non-diegetic music, and period pieces are not permitted. Trier differentiates the musical sequences from the rest of the film by using static cameras and by brightening the colours.

Music

 Original music: Björk
 Singers: Björk, Catherine Deneuve, Siobhan Fallon, David Morse, Cara Seymour, Edward Ross (for Vladica Kostic), Joel Grey, Peter Stormare (In the soundtrack Selmasongs, Thom Yorke sings instead of Stormare)
 Lyrics: Björk, Lars von Trier and Sjón
 Non-original music: Richard Rodgers (from The Sound of Music)
 Non-original lyrics: Oscar Hammerstein II (from The Sound of Music)
 Choreographer: Vincent Paterson

Controversy
In October 2017, Björk posted on her Facebook page that she had been sexually harassed by a "Danish film director she worked with". She commented:

The Los Angeles Times found evidence identifying him as Lars von Trier. Von Trier has rejected Björk's allegation that he sexually harassed her during the making of the film Dancer in the Dark, and said "That was not the case. But that we were definitely not friends, that's a fact", to Danish daily Jyllands-Posten in its online edition. Peter Aalbæk Jensen, the producer of Dancer in the Dark, told Jyllands-Posten that "as far as I remember we [Lars von Trier and I] were the victims. That woman was stronger than both Lars von Trier and me and our company put together. She dictated everything and was about to close a movie of 100m kroner [$16m]". After von Trier's statement, Björk explained the details about this incident:

Björk's manager, Derek Birkett, has also accused von Trier's actions in the past:

The Guardian later found that Jensen's studio, Zentropa, with which von Trier frequently collaborated, had an endemic culture of sexual harassment. Jensen stepped down from CEO position of Zentropa as further harassment allegations came to light in 2017.

Reception

Critical response

At the review aggregator Rotten Tomatoes, Dancer in the Dark earned positive reviews from 69% of 121 critics, with an average rating of 6.8/10. The critics consensus on the website reads, "Dancer in Dark can be grim, dull, and difficult to watch, but even so, it has a powerful and moving performance from Björk and is something quite new and visionary". According to Metacritic, which assigned the film a weighted average score of 61/100 based on 33 critic reviews, the film received "generally favorable reviews".

On The Movie Show, Margaret Pomeranz gave it five stars while David Stratton gave it a zero, a score shared only by Geoffrey Wright's Romper Stomper (1992). Stratton later described it as his "favourite horror film". Peter Bradshaw of The Guardian dubbed Dancer in the Dark the "most shallow and crudely manipulative" film of 2000, and in 2009 he described it as "one of the worst films, one of the worst artworks and perhaps one of the worst things in the history of the world".

The film was praised for its stylistic innovations. Roger Ebert of the Chicago Sun-Times wrote: "It smashes down the walls of habit that surround so many movies. It returns to the wellsprings. It is a bold, reckless gesture". Edward Guthmann from the San Francisco Chronicle wrote: "It's great to see a movie so courageous and affecting, so committed to its own differentness". However, criticism was directed at its storyline. Jonathan Foreman of the New York Post described the film as "meretricious fakery" and called it "so unrelenting in its manipulative sentimentality that, if it had been made by an American and shot in a more conventional manner, it would be seen as a bad joke". Fiachra Gibbons, writing for The Guardian, considered the film to be "the most unusual, extraordinary feel-good musical ever made".

In 2016, David Ehrlich ranked Dancer in the Dark as one of the best films of the 21st century, hailing Björk's performance as the "single greatest feat of film acting" since 2000. Björk's performance is also ranked in the "25 Best Performances Not Nominated for an Oscar of the 21st Century" list. Mia Goth credited the performance as one of her main influences, dubbing it "perfect" and "faultless".

Box office
It grossed $45.6 million worldwide, including $4.2 million in the United States and Canada. It was number one at the Japanese box office for three weeks.

Accolades
Dancer in the Dark premiered at the 2000 Cannes Film Festival and was awarded the Palme d'Or, along with the Best Actress award for Björk. The song "I've Seen It All" was nominated for an Academy Award for Best Original Song, at the performance of which Björk wore her famous swan dress.

Sight & Sound magazine conducts a poll every ten years of the world's finest film directors to find out the Ten Greatest Films of All Time. This poll has been going since 1952, and has become the most recognised poll of its kind in the world. In 2012, Cyrus Frisch was one of the four directors who voted for Dancer in the Dark. Frisch commented: "A superbly imaginative film that leaves conformity in shambles". Director Oliver Schmitz also lauded the work as "relentless, claustrophobic, the best movie about capital punishment as far as I'm concerned".

See also
 The opera Selma Ježková by Poul Ruders, which is based on the film.

References

Bibliography
 Georg Tiefenbach: Drama und Regie (Writing and Directing): Lars von Trier's Breaking the Waves, Dancer in the Dark, Dogville. Würzburg: Königshausen & Neumann 2010. .

External links

 
 
 
 
 Review by Sian Kirwan – BBC
 Review at The Film Experience

2000 crime drama films
2000 drama films
2000 films
2000s avant-garde and experimental films
2000s musical drama films
Constantin Film films
Courtroom films
Danish avant-garde and experimental films
Danish crime films
Danish musical drama films
English-language French films
English-language German films
English-language Italian films
English-language Danish films
European Film Awards winners (films)
Film4 Productions films
Films about blind people
Films about capital punishment
Films about immigration to the United States
Films adapted into operas
Films directed by Lars von Trier
Films set in 1964
Films set in factories
Films set in Washington (state)
Films shot in Denmark
French avant-garde and experimental films
French musical drama films
German avant-garde and experimental films
German musical drama films
Independent Spirit Award for Best Foreign Film winners
Palme d'Or winners
Swedish avant-garde and experimental films
Swedish musical drama films
Zentropa films
2000s English-language films
2000s French films
2000s German films
2000s Swedish films
Films about disability